Stone Arch Bridge is a historic stone arch bridge over the Ausable River at Keeseville in Clinton County and Essex County, New York.  It was built in 1843.

It was listed on the National Register of Historic Places in 1999.

References

Road bridges on the National Register of Historic Places in New York (state)
Bridges completed in 1843
Bridges in Clinton County, New York
Bridges in Essex County, New York
1843 establishments in New York (state)
National Register of Historic Places in Clinton County, New York
National Register of Historic Places in Essex County, New York
Stone arch bridges in the United States